Natasha Curry is the former anchor for HLN's Weekend Express with Natasha Curry. She also served as a replacement on the same network, when necessary, for Robin Meade on Morning Express with Robin Meade. She joined the network, then known as CNN's Headline News, in December 2008.

Personal
Curry received a bachelor's degree in biology from Pacific Lutheran University in Tacoma, Washington. She has studied at the Sichuan Union University in China and the Walter Cronkite School of Journalism at Arizona State University.

In 1998, Curry finished in the Top 10 in the Miss USA 1998 Pageant representing the state of Washington.

Curry served as a judge for the Miss USA 2018

Career
Prior to joining CNN in 2008, Curry was a morning anchor at KOMO-TV and co-host of Northwest Afternoon in Seattle.

She was also anchored newscasts for WLTX-TV in Columbia, South Carolina.  While in the palmetto state, Curry also produced the popular Midlands segment Restaurant Report Card and covered the passing of Senator Strom Thurmond. And the Space Shuttle Columbia Tragedy (STS-107). She also reported on a number of controversial issues, including protests over the Confederate flag being flown on State House grounds. 

Curry also worked as an anchor and reporter at KYMA-TV in Yuma, Arizona.

Filmography

References

External links
Brief bio from CNN website''

Living people
1976 births
American beauty pageant winners
American television reporters and correspondents
Miss Washington USA winners
Walter Cronkite School of Journalism and Mass Communication alumni
CNN people
People from Puyallup, Washington
Pacific Lutheran University alumni